Baydavletovo (Baydäwlät) is a rural locality (a selo) in Baydavletovsky Selsoviet, Zianchurinsky District, Bashkortostan, Russia. The population was 207 as of 2010. There is 1 street.

Geography 
Baydavletovo is located 30 km east of Isyangulovo (the district's administrative centre) by road. Suleymanovo is the nearest rural locality.

References 

Rural localities in Zianchurinsky District